Goga Chkheidze (born 11 February 1996) is a Georgian weightlifter competing in the 69 kg division until 2018 and 67 kg starting in 2018 after the International Weightlifting Federation reorganized the categories.

Career
He competed at the 2019 European Weightlifting Championships in the 67 kg category.

He competed in the men's 67 kg event at the 2020 Summer Olympics in Tokyo, Japan.

Major results

References

External links
 

1996 births
Living people
Male weightlifters from Georgia (country)
European Weightlifting Championships medalists
Weightlifters at the 2020 Summer Olympics
Olympic weightlifters of Georgia (country)